William Edgar Hayes (April 14, 1879 – April 2, 1939) was a provincial level politician from Alberta, Canada. He served as a member of the Legislative Assembly of Alberta sitting with the governing Social Credit caucus from 1935 until his death in 1939.

Political career
Hayes ran for a seat to the Alberta Legislature in the 1935 Alberta general election. He swept to power with almost 60% of the popular vote in the Stony Plain electoral district. He defeated three other candidates in the race including United Farmers incumbent Donald Macleod who finished a distant third.

Hayes died on April 2, 1939 from a reported heart seizure late into his first term in office at his home in Stony Plain, Alberta. He was buried in a cemetery in Edmonton. A large portion of the Social Credit caucus turned out including Premier William Aberhart.

References

External links
Legislative Assembly of Alberta Members Listing

Alberta Social Credit Party MLAs
1939 deaths
1879 births